Pareas macularius,  the mountain slug snake, is a species of snake found in India, Bangladesh, Myanmar, Thailand, Laos, Vietnam, Malaysia, and China.

References 

Pareas
Reptiles described in 1868